Loftur Sæmundsson (died 1163;;) was a chieftain of Oddi at Rangárvellir in the south part of Iceland. He was a member of the Oddaverjar family clan  and was the son of Sæmundur fróði who had established a school at Oddi.  He was married to Þóra Magnúsdóttir, daughter of king Magnus III of Norway. Loftur was the father of Jón Loftsson  who adopted Snorri Sturluson.

References 

Loftur Saemundsson
1133 deaths
Loftur Saemundsson
Year of birth unknown